Mićo Mićić (6 September 1956 – 23 December 2020) was a Bosnian Serb politician, mayor of Bijeljina for 16 years from 2004 until 2020 and a Republika Srpska entity minister.

Political career
Mićić finished primary and secondary technical school in Bijeljina, and then the Faculty of Physical Education in 1981 in Sarajevo. In the period from 1981 to 1992, Mićić worked as a professor at the high school center in Kalesija, and from 1992 to 1996 as a professor at the Technical School "Mihajlo Pupin" in Bijeljina.

From 1996 to 2000, Mićić was the head of the Department for Veterans' and Disabled Issues in the Administrative Service of the Municipality of Bijeljina.

After the 2000 parliamentary elections, Mićić was appointed Minister for refugees and displaced persons in the Government of the Republika Srpska. From 2003 to 2005, he served as Minister of Labor and Veterans' and Disabled Protection. He also served as vicepresident of the Serb Democratic Party (SDS).

In the local elections in October 2004, Mićić was elected mayor of Bijeljina, re-elected in 2008, 2012 and 2016. In 2013, the mayors and mayors of the municipalities and cities of the Republika Srpska elected Mićić as President of the Association of Municipalities and Cities of the Republika Srpska, and since 2017 he has been vicepresident of the Association. In 2017-2018 he also served as first chairman of the Network of Associations of Local Authorities of South-East Europe (NALAS).

In March 2020, Mićić was expelled from the SDS because of alleged pre-electoral negotiations with Milorad Dodik; he went on to found the Party of Democratic Srpska Semberija (SDSS), with which he was re-appointed as candidate for mayor of Bijeljina in coalition with Dodik's ruling SNSD party. At the 15 November municipal elections Mićić unexpectedly lost the re-election in favour of the opposition candidate Ljubiša Petrović (SDS).

Personal life
On 26 November 2020, Mićić tested positive for COVID-19 during the COVID-19 pandemic in Bosnia and Herzegovina and was taken to the University Hospital of Banja Luka, where he was connected to a ventilator on 2 December 2020. He died there three weeks later, on 23 December.

He was married and was the father of three children. Mićić was a holder of the Order of Saint Sava I and II order awarded by the Holy Synod of Bishops of the Serbian Orthodox Church.

References

External links

 Биографија на званичном сајту Града Бијељина 
 Mićić: SDS je stranka koja nestaje, oslobodjenje.ba, 3. Juni 2020
 Ko je bio Mićo Mićić, avaz.ba, 23. Dezember 2020

1956 births
2020 deaths
People from Bijeljina
Politicians of Republika Srpska
Serb Democratic Party (Bosnia and Herzegovina) politicians
Mayors of places in Bosnia and Herzegovina
Deaths from the COVID-19 pandemic in Bosnia and Herzegovina